The naval Battle of Calicut was a military encounter between the 16 ships (10 carracks and six caravels) of the 4th Portuguese Armada and a fleet led by two Arabic corsairs formed under the orders of the Zamorin of Calicut.

After the fleet of Vasco da Gama reunited with 6 caravels of the patrol fleet of Vicente Sodré, the Portuguese inflicted a heavy defeat on Calicut. In one of the first recorded instances of a naval line of battle, Gama's spice naus and escort caravels sailed in a line end-to-end, concentrating all their immense firepower as they passed against the twenty large Arab ships of Cojambar, before they could get organized, sinking a number of them and doing immense damage to the remainder.

On 30 October 1502, Vasco da Gama landed in Calicut on the Malabar coast for the second time. This time he had come in war. He came to seek revenge for the treatment meted out to Pedro Álvares Cabral who had come to Calicut earlier.

Pedro Álvares Cabral, was a Portuguese nobleman, military commander, navigator and explorer. He had come to make a treaty with the Zamorin of Calicut and to set up a Portuguese factory in the city. But he was not successful and there was conflict between the local Arab merchant guilds. The Portuguese factory was overrun in a riot and almost 70 Portuguese were killed. Cabral blamed the Zamorin and bombarded the city. War broke out between Portugal and Calicut.

Vasco da Gama invoked his royal letter and took command of the armada. He set sail with 15 heavily armed ships and 800 men.

References

Calicut 1503
Calicut 1503
1502 in India
1503 in India
History of Kozhikode